Priddy may refer to:

Priddy (surname)

Places

Priddy, a village in Somerset, England
Priddy Caves, caves at Priddy, England
Priddy Mineries, a reserve in Priddy, England
Priddy Pools, a place in Priddy, England
Priddy Circles, a stone circle or henge monument near the village of Priddy on the Mendip Hills in Somerset, England
Priddy's Hard, an area of Gosport, in Hampshire, England
Priddy, Texas, a small town in Texas
Priddy Independent School District, a school in Priddy, Texas